The 1st New Jersey Cavalry Regiment was a Union Army regiment from the U.S. state of New Jersey that participated in the American Civil War.

Organization and Unit History

The 1st New Jersey Cavalry Regiment was organized at Trenton, New Jersey, under authority of the United States Department of War on August 14, 1861, by William Halstead, a former congressman who served as first Colonel of the regiment.

Twelve enlisted soldiers of the regiment performed actions which later earned them the Medal of Honor. These men included:

Sgt. James T. Clancy, C Company - Vaughan Road, 1 October 1864
Cpl. William B. Hooper, L Company - Chamberlain's Creek, 31 March 1865
Pvt. Lewis Locke, A Company - Paine's Crossroads, 5 April 1865
Sgt. William Porter, H Company - Sayler's Creek, 6 April 1865
Sgt. John C. Sagelhurst, B Company - Hatcher's Run, 6 February 1865
Sgt. David Southard, C Company - Sayler's Creek, 6 April 1865
1st Sgt. George W. Stewart, E Company - Paine's Crossroads, 5 April 1865
Pvt. Christian Streile, I Company - Paine's Crossroads, 5 April 1865
Sgt. Charles Titus, H Company - Sayler's Creek, 6 April 1865
Sgt. Aaron B. Tompkins, G Company - Sayler's Creek, 5 April 1865
Sgt. Charles E. Wilson, A Company - Sayler's Creek, 6 April 1865
Sgt. John Wilson, L Company - Chamberlain's Creek, 31 March 1865

The regiment was mustered out at Cloud's Hills, Virginia, on July 24, 1865. During its service it lost 12 Officers and 116 Enlisted men killed and mortally wounded and 4 Officers and 185 Enlisted men by disease; for a total of 317.

Successor Unit

The 102nd Cavalry Regiment, part of the New Jersey Army National Guard, was originally designated the 1st New Jersey Cavalry Regiment. It was composed of existing cavalry troops throughout the state when it was established in 1913. While it is informally considered to be the successor to the 1st New Jersey Volunteer Cavalry, the official lineage was not carried over due to the nearly half-century lapse in regimental structure.

See also
 List of New Jersey Civil War Units

References

External links
 

Units and formations of the Union Army from New Jersey
1861 establishments in New Jersey